Asthenotricha comosissima is a species of moth of the family Geometridae. It is found in North Madagascar.

The length of its front wings is 16 mm.

References

Moths described in 1970
Asthenotricha
Moths of Madagascar
Moths of Africa